The New London Chorale was a British choir founded in 1979, released recordings under the direction of Tom Parker which popularized classical music. Parker died in 2013. The Chorale collaborated with solo singers, including Vicki Brown, Madeline Bell, Gordon Neville Janet Mooney and Katie Kissoon.

Discography

Albums
The Young Messiah (1979) - Vicki Brown, Madeline Bell, Steve Jerome, George 
The Young Matthew Passion (1986) - Vicki Brown, Madeline Bell, Gordon Neville, Steve Jerome
The Young Wolfgang Amadeus Mozart (1986) - Vicki Brown, Madeline Bell, Gordon Neville
The Young Christmas (1987) - Wild Gaynor, Gordon Neville
The Young Verdi (1988) - Vicki Brown, Madeline Bell, Gordon Neville
The Christmas Album (1989) - Vicki Brown, Gordon Neville, Shezwea Powell
The Young Beethoven (1990) - Vicki Brown, Juliet Roberts, Gordon Neville
The Young Puccini (1991) - Gordon Neville, Amy Vanmeenen, Marilyn David, Tony Jackson
The Young Schubert (1991) - Marilyn David, Amy Vanmeenen, Lance Ellington, Gordon Neville
The Young Tchaikovsky (1993) - Marilyn David, Amy Vanmeenen, Lance Ellington, Gordon Neville
Christmas with the New London Chorale (1994) - Marilyn David, Amy Vanmeenen, Lance Ellington, Gordon Neville
The Young Handel (1995) - Marilyn David, Amy Vanmeenen, Lance Ellington, Gordon Neville
Young Forever (1996)
Sing in with the New London Chorale (1996) - Marilyn David, Amy Vanmeenen, Lance Ellington, Gordon Neville
The New Amadeus Mozart (1997) - Amy Vanmeenen, Janet Mooney, Lance Ellington, Gordon Neville
It's for you (1999) - Amy Vanmeenen, Janet Mooney, Lance Ellington, Gordon Neville
The Young Mendelssohn (2004) - Amy Vanmeenen, Jackie Rawe, Lance Ellington, Gordon Neville
Viva Verdi (2012) - Janet Mooney,  Lance Ellington, Gordon Neville

Tom Parker, Other projects
Joy - Apollo 100 (1972)
Plaid Pops Orchestra (1976), with Tommy Scott
European Sound Project (1990)
The Ten Commandments (1990) Amy Vanmeenen, Anita Meyer, Rob de Nijs, Edward Reekers
Christmas - Berdien Stenberg (1986)
Pirouette - Berdien Stenberg (1987)
The Brand Burgers - Berdien Stenberg and Jaap van Zweden (1995)

References

British choirs